Purlie is a musical with a book by Ossie Davis, Philip Rose, and Peter Udell, lyrics by Udell and music by Gary Geld. It is based on Davis's 1961 play Purlie Victorious, which was later made into the 1963 film Gone Are the Days! and which included many of the original Broadway cast, including Davis, Ruby Dee, Alan Alda, Beah Richards, Godfrey Cambridge, and Sorrell Booke.

Plot 
Purlie is set in an era when Jim Crow laws still were in effect in the American South. Its focus is on the dynamic traveling preacher Purlie Victorious Judson, who returns to his small Georgia town hoping to save Big Bethel, the community's church, and emancipate the cotton pickers who work on oppressive Ol' Cap'n Cotchipee's plantation. With the assistance of Lutiebelle Gussie Mae Jenkins, Purlie hopes to pry loose from Cotchipee an inheritance due his long-lost cousin and use the money to achieve his goals. Also playing a part in Purlie's plans is Cotchipee's son Charlie, who ultimately proves to be far more fair-minded than his Simon Legree–like father and who saves the church from destruction with an act of defiance that has dire consequences for the tyrannical Cap'n.

Production notes 

Although Davis did not participate actively in the creation of the musical, so much of his original script was included in the final project that Peter Udell and Philip Rose felt he should share credit for the book.

After 28 previews, the Broadway production, directed by Rose and choreographed by Louis Johnson, opened on March 15, 1970, at the Broadway Theatre. It later transferred to the Winter Garden and then the ANTA Playhouse before completing its 688-performance run. The cast included Cleavon Little as Purlie, John Heffernan as Cotchipee, Melba Moore as Lutiebelle, and C. David Colson as Charlie, with Sherman Hemsley, Linda Hopkins, Novella Nelson, and Helen Martin in supporting roles. Robert Guillaume replaced Little later in the run. Johnson's choreography was nominated for a Tony Award.

The first edition of the original cast recording was released by Ampex Records; it was later re-released on RCA Victor.

A U.S. national tour, leading up to the Broadway revival, ran from November 20, 1971 to December 2, 1972. It featured Guillaume as Purlie, Patti Jo as Lutiebelle, Sherman Hemsley as Gitlow, Helen Martin as Idella, Tommy Breslin as Charlie and Art Wallace as Ol' Cap'n.

After two previews, a Broadway revival directed by Philip Rose and choreographed by Johnson opened on December 27, 1972, at the Billy Rose Theatre, where it ran for 14 performances. Guillame and Hemsley reprised their original roles, with Art Wallace as Cotchipee, Patti Jo as Lutiebelle, and Douglas Norwick as Charlie.

A 1981 television adaptation for Showtime directed by Rudi Goldman starred Broadway cast members Guillaume, Moore, Hemsley, and Hopkins, with Brandon Maggart as Cotchipee, Clarice Taylor as Idella, and Don Scardino as Charlie. The production won a CableACE Award.

The first London production was a fringe theatre staging at the Bridewell Theatre in 2004. The cast included Tee Jaye as Purlie, John Lyons as Cotchipee, Victoria Wilson-James as Missy Judson, and Joanna Francis as Lutiebelle.

In 2005, Sheldon Epps directed a US national tour co-produced by the Pasadena Playhouse and the Goodman Theatre. His New York City Center Encores! staging that same year featured Blair Underwood, Anika Noni Rose, Lillias White, and John Cullum.

Musical numbers

Awards and nominations

Original Broadway production

References

External links

 (1981 TV production)

1970 musicals
Broadway musicals
All-Black cast Broadway shows
Musicals based on plays
Plays about race and ethnicity
African-American films
Tony Award-winning musicals